is a video game developed by Millennium Kitchen and published by Sony Computer Entertainment for the PlayStation Portable. It is part of the popular Boku no Natsuyasumi series and was released in Japan on July 2, 2009. Like Boku no Natsuyasumi 2, it takes place in a Japanese coastal village.

Description
The main character spends his summer vacation in a coastal village in Japan. The games contain the familiar bug collecting, beetle fighting, swimming, fishing, morning exercises, and family meals from previous series entries, but also feature new activities, such as playing a taiko drum, challenging other children to duels with your mechanical toys, a beetle circus, and several tabletop games. Unlike other games in the series, taking place in the year 1975, this installment takes place in the summer of 1985.

Reception
Popular Japanese review magazine Famitsu rated the game a 31 out of 40 (8/8/8/7).

References

External links
 Official Website (SCE) 
 Official Trailers (HD) 

Single-player video games
Adventure games
Japan-exclusive video games
Sony Interactive Entertainment games
2009 video games
PlayStation Portable games
PlayStation Portable-only games
Video games developed in Japan
Video games about children
Video games about insects
Video game sequels
Video games set in 1985
Video games set in Japan
Works about vacationing
Millennium Kitchen games